The Sultan Abu Bakar Complex (KSAB; ; Jawi: کومڤليک‌س سلطان ابو بکر ) is a customs, immigration and quarantine (CIQ) complex in Tanjung Kupang, Iskandar Puteri, Johor, Malaysia. Located at the northern end of the Malaysia–Singapore Second Link, it is one of the two land ports of entry to Malaysia on the Malaysia–Singapore border.

The CIQ complex is named after Sultan Abu Bakar of Johor. From Malaysia, vehicular access is provided by the Second Link Expressway, continuing after border inspection onto the Second Link bridge to Tuas Checkpoint in Tuas, Singapore. Pedestrians are not permitted on the Second Link.

Components

Immigration Checkpoint

The immigration checkpoint has different checkpoints for motorcycles and cars.  The checkpoint was designed with 78 counters for cars entering Malaysia, and 39 counters for those departing from Malaysia. There are 50 counters in each direction for motorcycles entering and departing Malaysia. The Secured Automated Clearance System for Malaysian Citizen Motorcyclists (M-BIKE) are provided here for all Malaysian citizen motorcyclists.

Customs Checkpoint

At the customs checkpoint, 36 counters are designated for cars (20 for those arriving in Malaysia and 16 for those leaving the country) and 25 for motorcycles (17 for arrivals and 8 for departures).

KSAB Quarters

Near the complex is the KSAB quarters housing for Malaysian immigration and customs staff and have two schools Sekolah Kebangsaan Kompleks Sultan Abu Bakar (SKKSAB) primary schools and Sekolah Menengah Kebangsaan Kompleks Sultan Abu Bakar (SMKKSAB) secondary schools.

Buildings and structures in Iskandar Puteri
Malaysia–Singapore border crossings